Whiston is a civil parish in the Metropolitan Borough of Rotherham, South Yorkshire, England.  The parish contains 18 listed buildings that are recorded in the National Heritage List for England.  Of these, three are listed at Grade II*, the middle of the three grades, and the others are at Grade II, the lowest grade.  The parish contains the villages of Whiston and Morthen and the surrounding countryside.  Most of the listed buildings are houses and associated structures, farmhouses and farm buildings.  The other listed buildings include a church, a headstone in the churchyard, a cross base, a set of stocks, and two mileposts.


Key

Buildings

References

Citations

Sources

 

Lists of listed buildings in South Yorkshire
Buildings and structures in the Metropolitan Borough of Rotherham